Mark Dillard (born December 5, 1986) is a former American football safety. He was signed by the New England Patriots as an undrafted free agent in 2008. He played college football at Louisiana Tech.

Professional career

New England Patriots
Dillard was signed by the Patriots as an undrafted free agent on May 1, 2008. He was waived by the team on August 30, 2008, and signed to the team's practice squad on September 1, 2008. He was waived from the practice squad on September 10, 2008, and re-signed to the team's practice squad on September 15, 2008. He was again waived from the Patriots' practice squad on September 24, 2008. He was then re-signed to the Patriots' practice squad on October 22. His contract expired after the season.

External links
Louisiana Tech Bulldogs bio
New England Patriots bio

1986 births
Living people
Players of American football from Baton Rouge, Louisiana
American football running backs
American football safeties
Louisiana Tech Bulldogs football players
New England Patriots players